Telmatobius timens is a species of frogs in the family Telmatobiidae. It is found in western Bolivia and southeastern Peru at elevations of  asl.

Its natural habitats are humid puna grassland, elfin forest, Polylepis forest, and scrubland edges. Tadpoles develop in streams. Due to its population decline, the species is now listed as critically endangered.

References

Telmatobius
Amphibians described in 2005
Frogs of South America
Amphibians of the Andes
Amphibians of Bolivia
Amphibians of Peru
Taxonomy articles created by Polbot